Chinese people in Ireland refer to people born in China or people of Chinese descent living in the Republic of Ireland. They constitute 0.4% of Ireland's population, at 19,447 residents.

History
The first major wave of Chinese immigration to Ireland came from Hong Kong. This group often became business people, setting up their own restaurants and settling in Ireland permanently. A second wave began in the late 1990s when large numbers of students began to come to Ireland to study at Irish universities. 

In the 2010s the Irish government began the "Immigrant Investor Programme" in which non-EU citizens could purchase resident status in Ireland if they contributed to government-run projects such as social housing or nursing homes or by donating to Irish charities. The Irish Times reported in 2021 that 1,088 wealthy Chinese citizens (out of a total of 1,166 entering the programme) had paid up to €1,000,000 individually to receive Irish residency. In 2018 the Irish Independent reported that Ireland had become the 3rd most popular destination in the world for wealthy Chinese immigrants after the United States and the United Kingdom. A report found that in addition to the Immigrant Investor Programme, Ireland's place in the European Union, its technology sector and its low tax burden made it attractive to wealthy Chinese immigrants.

Demographics
In 2016 the Irish census recorded 19,447 Chinese people living in Ireland.

Politics
In 2020 Hazel Chu of the Green Party became the first Irish-born person of Chinese ethnicity to become Lord Mayor of Dublin. In doing so she was also the first person of Chinese ethnicity to become the mayor of a European capital city.

Tourism
In 2015, 40,000 Chinese people visited Ireland, an increase of 10% from 2014.

Notable people
Lee Chin, GAA player
Hazel Chu, politician
Michael Craig-Martin, artist 
Eden (Jonathon Ng), musician
Greg O'Shea, rugby player 
Jason Sherlock, footballer and Gaelic footballer 
Da-Wen Sun, academic
Thaddea Graham, actress

References

 
Irish
Irish
Ethnic groups in Ireland